In statistics, the logistic model (or logit model) is a statistical model that models the probability of an event taking place by having the log-odds for the event be a linear combination of one or more independent variables. In regression analysis, logistic regression (or logit regression) is estimating the parameters of a logistic model (the coefficients in the linear combination). Formally, in binary logistic regression there is a single binary dependent variable, coded by an indicator variable, where the two values are labeled "0" and "1", while the independent variables can each be a binary variable (two classes, coded by an indicator variable) or a continuous variable (any real value). The corresponding probability of the value labeled "1" can vary between 0 (certainly the value "0") and 1 (certainly the value "1"), hence the labeling; the function that converts log-odds to probability is the logistic function, hence the name. The unit of measurement for the log-odds scale is called a logit, from logistic unit, hence the alternative names.

Binary variables are widely used in statistics to model the probability of a certain class or event taking place, such as the probability of a team winning, of a patient being healthy, etc. (see ), and the logistic model has been the most commonly used model for binary regression since about 1970. Binary variables can be generalized to categorical variables when there are more than two possible values (e.g. whether an image is of a cat, dog, lion, etc.), and the binary logistic regression generalized to multinomial logistic regression. If the multiple categories are ordered, one can use the ordinal logistic regression (for example the proportional odds ordinal logistic model). See  for further extensions. The logistic regression model itself simply models probability of output in terms of input and does not perform statistical classification (it is not a classifier), though it can be used to make a classifier, for instance by choosing a cutoff value and classifying inputs with probability greater than the cutoff as one class, below the cutoff as the other; this is a common way to make a binary classifier.

Analogous linear models for binary variables with a different sigmoid function instead of the logistic function (to convert the linear combination to a probability) can also be used, most notably the probit model; see . The defining characteristic of the logistic model is that increasing one of the independent variables multiplicatively scales the odds of the given outcome at a constant rate, with each independent variable having its own parameter; for a binary dependent variable this generalizes the odds ratio. More abstractly, the logistic function is the natural parameter for the Bernoulli distribution, and in this sense is the "simplest" way to convert a real number to a probability. In particular, it maximizes entropy (minimizes added information), and in this sense makes the fewest assumptions of the data being modeled; see .

The parameters of a logistic regression are most commonly estimated by maximum-likelihood estimation (MLE). This does not have a closed-form expression, unlike linear least squares; see . Logistic regression by MLE plays a similarly basic role for binary or categorical responses as linear regression by ordinary least squares (OLS) plays for scalar responses: it is a simple, well-analyzed baseline model; see  for discussion.

Applications
Logistic regression is used in various fields, including machine learning, most medical fields, and social sciences. For example, the Trauma and Injury Severity Score (TRISS), which is widely used to predict mortality in injured patients, was originally developed by Boyd  using logistic regression.  Many other medical scales used to assess severity of a patient have been developed using logistic regression. Logistic regression may be used to predict the risk of developing a given disease (e.g. diabetes; coronary heart disease), based on observed characteristics of the patient (age, sex, body mass index, results of various blood tests, etc.).  Another example might be to predict whether a Nepalese voter will vote Nepali Congress or Communist Party of Nepal or Any Other Party, based on age, income, sex, race, state of residence, votes in previous elections, etc. The technique can also be used in engineering, especially for predicting the probability of failure of a given process, system or product. It is also used in marketing applications such as prediction of a customer's propensity to purchase a product or halt a subscription, etc. In economics, it can be used to predict the likelihood of a person ending up in the labor force, and a business application would be to predict the likelihood of a homeowner defaulting on a mortgage. Conditional random fields, an extension of logistic regression to sequential data, are used in natural language processing.

Example

Problem
As a simple example, we can use a logistic regression with one explanatory variable and two categories to answer the following question:
A group of 20 students spends between 0 and 6 hours studying for an exam. How does the number of hours spent studying affect the probability of the student passing the exam?

The reason for using logistic regression for this problem is that the values of the dependent variable, pass and fail, while represented by "1" and "0", are not cardinal numbers. If the problem was changed so that pass/fail was replaced with the grade 0–100 (cardinal numbers), then simple regression analysis could be used.

The table shows the number of hours each student spent studying, and whether they passed (1) or failed (0).

We wish to fit a logistic function to the data consisting of the hours studied (xk) and the outcome of the test (yk =1 for pass, 0 for fail). The x variable is called the "explanatory variable", and the y variable is called the "categorical variable" consisting of two categories: "pass" or "fail" corresponding to the categorical values 1 and 0 respectively.

Model

The logistic function is of the form:

where μ is a location parameter (the midpoint of the curve, where ) and s is a scale parameter. This expression may be rewritten as:

Fit
The usual measure of goodness of fit for a logistic regression uses logistic loss (or log loss), the negative log-likelihood. For a given xk and yk, write . In the case of linear regression, the sum of the squared deviations of the fit from the data points (yk), the squared error loss, is taken as a measure of the goodness of fit, and the best fit is obtained when that function is minimized.

The log loss for the k-th point is:

The log loss can be interpreted as the "surprisal" of the actual outcome  relative to the prediction , and is a measure of information content. Since the value of the logistic function is always strictly between zero and one, the log loss is always greater than zero and less than infinity. Note that unlike in a linear regression, where the model can have zero loss at a point by passing through a data point (and zero loss overall if all points are on a line), in a logistic regression it is not possible to have zero loss at any points, since  is either 0 or 1, but .

These can be combined into a single expression:

This expression is more formally known as the cross entropy of the predicted distribution  from the actual distribution , as probability distributions on the two-element space of (pass, fail).

Alternatively, instead of minimizing the loss, one can maximize its inverse, the (positive) log-likelihood:

or equivalently maximize the likelihood function itself, which is the probability that the given data set is produced by a particular logistic function:

This method is known as maximum likelihood estimation.

Parameter estimation

which yields a value for μ and s of:

Predictions
The  and  coefficients may be entered into the logistic regression equation to estimate the probability of passing the exam.

For example, for a student who studies 2 hours, entering the value  into the equation gives the estimated probability of passing the exam of 0.25:

 

 

Similarly, for a student who studies 4 hours, the estimated probability of passing the exam is 0.87:

 

 

This table shows the estimated probability of passing the exam for several values of hours studying.

Model evaluation
The logistic regression analysis gives the following output.

By the Wald test, the output indicates that hours studying is significantly associated with the probability of passing the exam.

Generalizations
This simple model is an example of binary logistic regression, and has one explanatory variable and a binary categorical variable which can assume one of two categorical values. Multinomial logistic regression is the generalization of binary logistic regression to include any number of explanatory variables and any number of categories.

Background

Definition of the logistic function
An explanation of logistic regression can begin with an explanation of the standard logistic function. The logistic function is a sigmoid function, which takes any real input , and outputs a value between zero and one. For the logit, this is interpreted as taking input log-odds and having output probability. The standard logistic function  is defined as follows:

A graph of the logistic function on the t-interval (−6,6) is shown in Figure 1.

Let us assume that  is a linear function of a single explanatory variable  (the case where  is a linear combination of multiple explanatory variables is treated similarly). We can then express  as follows:

And the general logistic function  can now be written as:

In the logistic model,  is interpreted as the probability of the dependent variable  equaling a success/case rather than a failure/non-case. It's clear that the response variables  are not identically distributed:  differs from one data point  to another, though they are independent given design matrix  and shared parameters .

Definition of the inverse of the logistic function
We can now define the logit (log odds) function as the inverse  of the standard logistic function. It is easy to see that it satisfies:

and equivalently, after exponentiating both sides we have the odds:

Interpretation of these terms
In the above equations, the terms are as follows:

  is the logit function. The equation for  illustrates that the logit (i.e., log-odds or natural logarithm of the odds) is equivalent to the linear regression expression.
  denotes the natural logarithm.
  is the probability that the dependent variable equals a case, given some linear combination of the predictors. The formula for  illustrates that the probability of the dependent variable equaling a case is equal to the value of the logistic function of the linear regression expression. This is important in that it shows that the value of the linear regression expression can vary from negative to positive infinity and yet, after transformation, the resulting expression for the probability  ranges between 0 and 1.
  is the intercept from the linear regression equation (the value of the criterion when the predictor is equal to zero).
  is the regression coefficient multiplied by some value of the predictor.
 base  denotes the exponential function.

Definition of the odds
The odds of the dependent variable equaling a case (given some linear combination  of the predictors) is equivalent to the exponential function of the linear regression expression. This illustrates how the logit serves as a link function between the probability and the linear regression expression. Given that the logit ranges between negative and positive infinity, it provides an adequate criterion upon which to conduct linear regression and the logit is easily converted back into the odds.

So we define odds of the dependent variable equaling a case (given some linear combination  of the predictors) as follows:

The odds ratio
For a continuous independent variable the odds ratio can be defined as:

For a binary independent variable the odds ratio is defined as  where a, b, c and d are cells in a 2×2 contingency table.

Multiple explanatory variables
Then when this is used in the equation relating the log odds of a success to the values of the predictors, the linear regression will be a multiple regression with m explanators; the parameters  for all  are all estimated.

Again, the more traditional equations are:

and

where usually .

Definition
The basic setup of logistic regression is as follows. We are given a dataset containing N points. Each point i consists of a set of m input variables x1,i ... xm,i (also called independent variables, explanatory variables, predictor variables, features, or attributes), and a binary outcome variable Yi (also known as a dependent variable, response variable, output variable, or class), i.e. it can assume only the two possible values 0 (often meaning "no" or "failure") or 1 (often meaning "yes" or "success"). The goal of logistic regression is to use the dataset to create a predictive model of the outcome variable.

As in linear regression, the outcome variables Yi are assumed to depend on the explanatory variables x1,i ... xm,i.

 Explanatory variables
The explanatory variables may be of any type: real-valued, binary, categorical, etc.  The main distinction is between continuous variables and discrete variables.

(Discrete variables referring to more than two possible choices are typically coded using dummy variables (or indicator variables), that is, separate explanatory variables taking the value 0 or 1 are created for each possible value of the discrete variable, with a 1 meaning "variable does have the given value" and a 0 meaning "variable does not have that value".)

Outcome variables
Formally, the outcomes Yi are described as being Bernoulli-distributed data, where each outcome is determined by an unobserved probability pi that is specific to the outcome at hand, but related to the explanatory variables.  This can be expressed in any of the following equivalent forms:

The meanings of these four lines are:
 The first line expresses the probability distribution of each Yi : conditioned on the explanatory variables, it follows a Bernoulli distribution with parameters pi, the probability of the outcome of 1 for trial i. As noted above, each separate trial has its own probability of success, just as each trial has its own explanatory variables.  The probability of success pi is not observed, only the outcome of an individual Bernoulli trial using that probability.
 The second line expresses the fact that the expected value of each Yi is equal to the probability of success pi, which is a general property of the Bernoulli distribution.  In other words, if we run a large number of Bernoulli trials using the same probability of success pi, then take the average of all the 1 and 0 outcomes, then the result would be close to pi.  This is because doing an average this way simply computes the proportion of successes seen, which we expect to converge to the underlying probability of success.
 The third line writes out the probability mass function of the Bernoulli distribution, specifying the probability of seeing each of the two possible outcomes.
 The fourth line is another way of writing the probability mass function, which avoids having to write separate cases and is more convenient for certain types of calculations.  This relies on the fact that Yi can take only the value 0 or 1.  In each case, one of the exponents will be 1, "choosing" the value under it, while the other is 0, "canceling out" the value under it.  Hence, the outcome is either pi or 1 − pi, as in the previous line.

 Linear predictor function
The basic idea of logistic regression is to use the mechanism already developed for linear regression by modeling the probability pi using a linear predictor function, i.e. a linear combination of the explanatory variables and a set of regression coefficients that are specific to the model at hand but the same for all trials.  The linear predictor function  for a particular data point i is written as:

where  are regression coefficients indicating the relative effect of a particular explanatory variable on the outcome.

The model is usually put into a more compact form as follows:
 The regression coefficients β0, β1, ..., βm are grouped into a single vector β of size m + 1.
 For each data point i, an additional explanatory pseudo-variable x0,i is added, with a fixed value of 1, corresponding to the intercept coefficient β0.
 The resulting explanatory variables x0,i, x1,i, ..., xm,i are then grouped into a single vector Xi of size m + 1.

This makes it possible to write the linear predictor function as follows:

using the notation for a dot product between two vectors.

Many explanatory variables, two categories 

The above example of binary logistic regression on one explanatory variable can be generalized to binary logistic regression on any number of explanatory variables x1, x2,... and any number of categorical values .

To begin with, we may consider a logistic model with M explanatory variables, x1, x2 ... xM and, as in the example above, two categorical values (y = 0 and 1). For the simple binary logistic regression model, we assumed a linear relationship between the predictor variable and the log-odds (also called logit) of the event that . This linear relationship may be extended to the case of M explanatory variables: 

An additional generalization has been introduced in which the base of the model (b) is not restricted to the Euler number e. In most applications, the base  of the logarithm is usually taken to be e. However, in some cases it can be easier to communicate results by working in base 2 or base 10.

For a more compact notation, we will specify the explanatory variables and the β coefficients as -dimensional vectors:

with an added explanatory variable x0 =1. The logit may now be written as:

Solving for the probability p that  yields:

,

where  is the sigmoid function with base . The main use-case of a logistic model is to be given an observation , and estimate the probability  that . The optimum beta coefficients may again be found by maximizing the log-likelihood.

As in the simple example above, finding the optimum β parameters will require numerical methods. One useful technique is to equate the derivatives of the log likelihood with respect to each of the β parameters to zero yielding a set of equations which will hold at the maximum of the log likelihood:

where xmk is the value of the xm explanatory variable from the k-th measurement.

To be concrete, the model is:

,

where p is the probability of the event that . This can be interpreted as follows:

  is the y-intercept. It is the log-odds of the event that , when the predictors . Similarly, the probability of the event that  when  can be computed as 
Note that the probability of  has also increased, but it has not increased by as much as the odds have increased.

Multinomial logistic regression: Many explanatory variables and many categories 

The sum of both probabilities is equal to unity, as they must be.

In general, if we have  explanatory variables (including x0) and  categories, we will need  separate probability distributions,  one for each category, indexed by n, which describe the probability that the categorical outcome y for explanatory vector x will be in category y=n. It will also be required that the sum of these probabilities over all categories be equal to unity. Using the mathematically convenient base e, these probabilities are:

 for 

Each of the probabilities except  will have their own set of regression coefficients . Any of the probabilities could have been selected to be so defined. This special value of n is termed the "pivot index", and the log-odds (tn) are expressed in terms of the pivot probability and are again expressed as a linear combination of the explanatory variables:

The log-likelihood that a particular set of K measurements or data points will be generated by the above probabilities can now be calculated. The log-likelihood is then:

where  is an indicator function which is equal to unity if yk = n and zero otherwise. In the case of two explanatory variables, this indicator function was defined as yk when n = 1 and 1-yk when n = 0. This was convenient, but not necessary. Again, the optimum beta coefficients may be found by maximizing the log-likelihood function generally using numerical methods. A possible method of solution is to set the derivatives of the log-likelihood with respect to each beta coefficient equal to zero and solve for the beta coefficients:

Once the beta coefficients have been estimated from the data, we will be able to estimate the probability that any subsequent set of explanatory variables will result in any of the possible outcome categories.

Interpretations
There are various equivalent specifications and interpretations of logistic regression, which fit into different types of more general models, and allow different generalizations.

As a generalized linear model
The particular model used by logistic regression, which distinguishes it from standard linear regression and from other types of regression analysis used for binary-valued outcomes, is the way the probability of a particular outcome is linked to the linear predictor function:

Written using the more compact notation described above, this is:

This formulation expresses logistic regression as a type of generalized linear model, which predicts variables with various types of probability distributions by fitting a linear predictor function of the above form to some sort of arbitrary transformation of the expected value of the variable.

The intuition for transforming using the logit function (the natural log of the odds) was explained above.  It also has the practical effect of converting the probability (which is bounded to be between 0 and 1) to a variable that ranges over  — thereby matching the potential range of the linear prediction function on the right side of the equation.

Note that both the probabilities pi and the regression coefficients are unobserved, and the means of determining them is not part of the model itself.  They are typically determined by some sort of optimization procedure, e.g. maximum likelihood estimation, that finds values that best fit the observed data (i.e. that give the most accurate predictions for the data already observed), usually subject to regularization conditions that seek to exclude unlikely values, e.g. extremely large values for any of the regression coefficients.  The use of a regularization condition is equivalent to doing maximum a posteriori (MAP) estimation, an extension of maximum likelihood.  (Regularization is most commonly done using a squared regularizing function, which is equivalent to placing a zero-mean Gaussian prior distribution on the coefficients, but other regularizers are also possible.)  Whether or not regularization is used, it is usually not possible to find a closed-form solution; instead, an iterative numerical method must be used, such as iteratively reweighted least squares (IRLS) or, more commonly these days, a quasi-Newton method such as the L-BFGS method.

The interpretation of the βj parameter estimates is as the additive effect on the log of the odds for a unit change in the j the explanatory variable.  In the case of a dichotomous explanatory variable, for instance, gender  is the estimate of the odds of having the outcome for, say, males compared with females.

An equivalent formula uses the inverse of the logit function, which is the logistic function, i.e.:

The formula can also be written as a probability distribution (specifically, using a probability mass function):

As a latent-variable model
The logistic model has an equivalent formulation as a latent-variable model.  This formulation is common in the theory of discrete choice models and makes it easier to extend to certain more complicated models with multiple, correlated choices, as well as to compare logistic regression to the closely related probit model.

Imagine that, for each trial i, there is a continuous latent variable Yi* (i.e. an unobserved random variable) that is distributed as follows:

 
where
 
i.e. the latent variable can be written directly in terms of the linear predictor function and an additive random error variable that is distributed according to a standard logistic distribution.

Then Yi can be viewed as an indicator for whether this latent variable is positive:
 

The choice of modeling the error variable specifically with a standard logistic distribution, rather than a general logistic distribution with the location and scale set to arbitrary values, seems restrictive, but in fact, it is not.  It must be kept in mind that we can choose the regression coefficients ourselves, and very often can use them to offset changes in the parameters of the error variable's distribution.  For example, a logistic error-variable distribution with a non-zero location parameter μ (which sets the mean) is equivalent to a distribution with a zero location parameter, where μ has been added to the intercept coefficient.  Both situations produce the same value for Yi* regardless of settings of explanatory variables.  Similarly, an arbitrary scale parameter s is equivalent to setting the scale parameter to 1 and then dividing all regression coefficients by s.  In the latter case, the resulting value of Yi* will be smaller by a factor of s than in the former case, for all sets of explanatory variables — but critically, it will always remain on the same side of 0, and hence lead to the same Yi choice.

(Note that this predicts that the irrelevancy of the scale parameter may not carry over into more complex models where more than two choices are available.)

It turns out that this formulation is exactly equivalent to the preceding one, phrased in terms of the generalized linear model and without any latent variables.  This can be shown as follows, using the fact that the cumulative distribution function (CDF) of the standard logistic distribution is the logistic function, which is the inverse of the logit function, i.e.

Then:

This formulation—which is standard in discrete choice models—makes clear the relationship between logistic regression (the "logit model") and the probit model, which uses an error variable distributed according to a standard normal distribution instead of a standard logistic distribution.  Both the logistic and normal distributions are symmetric with a basic unimodal, "bell curve" shape.  The only difference is that the logistic distribution has somewhat heavier tails, which means that it is less sensitive to outlying data (and hence somewhat more robust to model mis-specifications or erroneous data).

Two-way latent-variable model
Yet another formulation uses two separate latent variables:

 

where

 

where EV1(0,1) is a standard type-1 extreme value distribution: i.e.

Then

 

This model has a separate latent variable and a separate set of regression coefficients for each possible outcome of the dependent variable.  The reason for this separation is that it makes it easy to extend logistic regression to multi-outcome categorical variables, as in the multinomial logit model. In such a model, it is natural to model each possible outcome using a different set of regression coefficients.  It is also possible to motivate each of the separate latent variables as the theoretical utility associated with making the associated choice, and thus motivate logistic regression in terms of utility theory. (In terms of utility theory, a rational actor always chooses the choice with the greatest associated utility.) This is the approach taken by economists when formulating discrete choice models, because it both provides a theoretically strong foundation and facilitates intuitions about the model, which in turn makes it easy to consider various sorts of extensions. (See the example below.)

The choice of the type-1 extreme value distribution seems fairly arbitrary, but it makes the mathematics work out, and it may be possible to justify its use through rational choice theory.

It turns out that this model is equivalent to the previous model, although this seems non-obvious, since there are now two sets of regression coefficients and error variables, and the error variables have a different distribution.  In fact, this model reduces directly to the previous one with the following substitutions:

An intuition for this comes from the fact that, since we choose based on the maximum of two values, only their difference matters, not the exact values — and this effectively removes one degree of freedom. Another critical fact is that the difference of two type-1 extreme-value-distributed variables is a logistic distribution, i.e.  We can demonstrate the equivalent as follows:

Example
  
As an example, consider a province-level election where the choice is between a right-of-center party, a left-of-center party, and a secessionist party (e.g. the Parti Québécois, which wants Quebec to secede from Canada).  We would then use three latent variables, one for each choice.  Then, in accordance with utility theory, we can then interpret the latent variables as expressing the utility that results from making each of the choices.  We can also interpret the regression coefficients as indicating the strength that the associated factor (i.e. explanatory variable) has in contributing to the utility — or more correctly, the amount by which a unit change in an explanatory variable changes the utility of a given choice.  A voter might expect that the right-of-center party would lower taxes, especially on rich people.  This would give low-income people no benefit, i.e. no change in utility (since they usually don't pay taxes); would cause moderate benefit (i.e. somewhat more money, or moderate utility increase) for middle-incoming people; would cause significant benefits for high-income people.  On the other hand, the left-of-center party might be expected to raise taxes and offset it with increased welfare and other assistance for the lower and middle classes.  This would cause significant positive benefit to low-income people, perhaps a weak benefit to middle-income people, and significant negative benefit to high-income people.  Finally, the secessionist party would take no direct actions on the economy, but simply secede. A low-income or middle-income voter might expect basically no clear utility gain or loss from this, but a high-income voter might expect negative utility since he/she is likely to own companies, which will have a harder time doing business in such an environment and probably lose money.

These intuitions can be expressed as follows:

This clearly shows that
 Separate sets of regression coefficients need to exist for each choice.  When phrased in terms of utility, this can be seen very easily. Different choices have different effects on net utility; furthermore, the effects vary in complex ways that depend on the characteristics of each individual, so there need to be separate sets of coefficients for each characteristic, not simply a single extra per-choice characteristic.
 Even though income is a continuous variable, its effect on utility is too complex for it to be treated as a single variable.  Either it needs to be directly split up into ranges, or higher powers of income need to be added so that polynomial regression on income is effectively done.

As a "log-linear" model
Yet another formulation combines the two-way latent variable formulation above with the original formulation higher up without latent variables, and in the process provides a link to one of the standard formulations of the multinomial logit.

Here, instead of writing the logit of the probabilities pi as a linear predictor, we separate the linear predictor into two, one for each of the two outcomes:

 

Two separate sets of regression coefficients have been introduced, just as in the two-way latent variable model, and the two equations appear a form that writes the logarithm of the associated probability as a linear predictor, with an extra term  at the end.  This term, as it turns out, serves as the normalizing factor ensuring that the result is a distribution.  This can be seen by exponentiating both sides:

 

In this form it is clear that the purpose of Z is to ensure that the resulting distribution over Yi is in fact a probability distribution, i.e. it sums to 1.  This means that Z is simply the sum of all un-normalized probabilities, and by dividing each probability by Z, the probabilities become "normalized".  That is:

and the resulting equations are

Or generally:

This shows clearly how to generalize this formulation to more than two outcomes, as in multinomial logit.
Note that this general formulation is exactly the softmax function as in

In order to prove that this is equivalent to the previous model, note that the above model is overspecified, in that  and  cannot be independently specified: rather  so knowing one automatically determines the other.  As a result, the model is nonidentifiable, in that multiple combinations of β0 and β1 will produce the same probabilities for all possible explanatory variables.  In fact, it can be seen that adding any constant vector to both of them will produce the same probabilities:

As a result, we can simplify matters, and restore identifiability, by picking an arbitrary value for one of the two vectors.  We choose to set   Then,

and so

which shows that this formulation is indeed equivalent to the previous formulation. (As in the two-way latent variable formulation, any settings where  will produce equivalent results.)

Note that most treatments of the multinomial logit model start out either by extending the "log-linear" formulation presented here or the two-way latent variable formulation presented above, since both clearly show the way that the model could be extended to multi-way outcomes.  In general, the presentation with latent variables is more common in econometrics and political science, where discrete choice models and utility theory reign, while the "log-linear" formulation here is more common in computer science, e.g. machine learning and natural language processing.

As a single-layer perceptron
The model has an equivalent formulation

This functional form is commonly called a single-layer perceptron or single-layer artificial neural network. A single-layer neural network computes a continuous output instead of a step function. The derivative of pi with respect to  X = (x1, ..., xk) is computed from the general form:

 

where f(X) is an analytic function in X. With this choice, the single-layer neural network is identical to the logistic regression model. This function has a continuous derivative, which allows it to be used in backpropagation. This function is also preferred because its derivative is easily calculated:

In terms of binomial data
A closely related model assumes that each i is associated not with a single Bernoulli trial but with ni independent identically distributed trials, where the observation Yi is the number of successes observed (the sum of the individual Bernoulli-distributed random variables), and hence follows a binomial distribution:

An example of this distribution is the fraction of seeds (pi) that germinate after ni are planted.

In terms of expected values, this model is expressed as follows:

so that

Or equivalently:

This model can be fit using the same sorts of methods as the above more basic model.

Model fitting

Maximum likelihood estimation (MLE)

The regression coefficients are usually estimated using maximum likelihood estimation. Unlike linear regression with normally distributed residuals, it is not possible to find a closed-form expression for the coefficient values that maximize the likelihood function, so that an iterative process must be used instead; for example Newton's method. This process begins with a tentative solution, revises it slightly to see if it can be improved, and repeats this revision until no more improvement is made, at which point the process is said to have converged.

In some instances, the model may not reach convergence. Non-convergence of a model indicates that the coefficients are not meaningful because the iterative process was unable to find appropriate solutions. A failure to converge may occur for a number of reasons: having a large ratio of predictors to cases, multicollinearity, sparseness, or complete separation.
 Having a large ratio of variables to cases results in an overly conservative Wald statistic (discussed below) and can lead to non-convergence. Regularized logistic regression is specifically intended to be used in this situation.
 Multicollinearity refers to unacceptably high correlations between predictors. As multicollinearity increases, coefficients remain unbiased but standard errors increase and the likelihood of model convergence decreases. To detect multicollinearity amongst the predictors, one can conduct a linear regression analysis with the predictors of interest for the sole purpose of examining the tolerance statistic   used to assess whether multicollinearity is unacceptably high.
 Sparseness in the data refers to having a large proportion of empty cells (cells with zero counts). Zero cell counts are particularly problematic with categorical predictors. With continuous predictors, the model can infer values for the zero cell counts, but this is not the case with categorical predictors. The model will not converge with zero cell counts for categorical predictors because the natural logarithm of zero is an undefined value so that the final solution to the model cannot be reached. To remedy this problem, researchers may collapse categories in a theoretically meaningful way or add a constant to all cells.
 Another numerical problem that may lead to a lack of convergence is complete separation, which refers to the instance in which the predictors perfectly predict the criterion – all cases are accurately classified and the likelihood maximized with infinite coefficients. In such instances, one should re-examine the data, as there may be some kind of error.
 One can also take semi-parametric or non-parametric approaches, e.g., via local-likelihood or nonparametric quasi-likelihood methods, which avoid assumptions of a parametric form for the index function and is robust to the choice of the link function (e.g., probit or logit).

Iteratively reweighted least squares (IRLS) 

Binary logistic regression ( or ) can, for example, be calculated using iteratively reweighted least squares (IRLS), which is equivalent to maximizing the log-likelihood of a Bernoulli distributed  process using Newton's method. If the problem is written in vector matrix form, with parameters , explanatory variables  and expected value of the Bernoulli distribution , the parameters  can be found using the following iterative algorithm:

where  is a diagonal weighting matrix,  the vector of expected values,

The regressor matrix and  the vector of response variables. More details can be found in the literature.

Bayesian

In a Bayesian statistics context, prior distributions are normally placed on the regression coefficients, for example in the form of Gaussian distributions.  There is no conjugate prior of the likelihood function in logistic regression.  When Bayesian inference was performed analytically, this made the posterior distribution difficult to calculate except in very low dimensions.  Now, though, automatic software such as OpenBUGS, JAGS, PyMC3, Stan or Turing.jl allows these posteriors to be computed using simulation, so lack of conjugacy is not a concern.  However, when the sample size or the number of parameters is large, full Bayesian simulation can be slow, and people often use approximate methods such as variational Bayesian methods and expectation propagation.

"Rule of ten"

A widely used rule of thumb, the "one in ten rule", states that logistic regression models give stable values for the explanatory variables if based on a minimum of about 10 events per explanatory variable (EPV); where event denotes the cases belonging to the less frequent category in the dependent variable. Thus a study designed to use  explanatory variables for an event (e.g. myocardial infarction) expected to occur in a proportion  of participants in the study will require a total of  participants. However, there is considerable debate about the reliability of this rule, which is based on simulation studies and lacks a secure theoretical underpinning. According to some authors the rule is overly conservative in some circumstances, with the authors stating, "If we (somewhat subjectively) regard confidence interval coverage less than 93 percent, type I error greater than 7 percent, or relative bias greater than 15 percent as problematic, our results indicate that problems are fairly frequent with 2–4 EPV, uncommon with 5–9 EPV, and still observed with 10–16 EPV. The worst instances of each problem were not severe with 5–9 EPV and usually comparable to those with 10–16 EPV".

Others have found results that are not consistent with the above, using different criteria.  A useful criterion is whether the fitted model will be expected to achieve the same predictive discrimination in a new sample as it appeared to achieve in the model development sample.  For that criterion, 20 events per candidate variable may be required.  Also, one can argue that 96 observations are needed only to estimate the model's intercept precisely enough that the margin of error in predicted probabilities is ±0.1 with a 0.95 confidence level.

Error and significance of fit

Deviance and likelihood ratio test ─ a simple case  
In any fitting procedure, the addition of another fitting parameter to a model (e.g. the beta parameters in a logistic regression model) will almost always improve the ability of the model to predict the measured outcomes. This will be true even if the additional term has no predictive value, since the model will simply be "overfitting" to the noise in the data.  The question arises as to whether the improvement gained by the addition of another fitting parameter is significant enough to recommend the inclusion of the additional term, or whether the improvement is simply that which may be expected from overfitting.

In short, for logistic regression, a statistic known as the deviance is defined which is a measure of the error between the logistic model fit and the outcome data. In the limit of a large number of data points, the deviance is chi-squared distributed, which allows a chi-squared test to be implemented in order to determine the significance of the explanatory variables.

Linear regression and logistic regression have many similarities. For example, in simple linear regression, a set of K data points (xk, yk) are fitted to a proposed model function of the form . The fit is obtained by choosing the b parameters which minimize the sum of the squares of the residuals (the squared error term) for each data point:

The minimum value which constitutes the fit will be denoted by 

The idea of a null model may be introduced, in which it is assumed that the x variable is of no use in predicting the yk outcomes: The data points are fitted to a null model function of the form y=b0 with a squared error term:

The fitting process consists of choosing a value of b0 which minimizes  of the fit to the null model, denoted by   where the  subscript denotes the null model. It is seen that the null model is optimized by  where  is the mean of the yk values, and the optimized  is:

which is proportional to the square of the (uncorrected) sample standard deviation of the yk data points.

We can imagine a case where the yk data points are randomly assigned to the various xk, and then fitted using the proposed model. Specifically, we can consider the fits of the proposed model to every permutation of the yk outcomes. It can be shown that the optimized error of any of these fits will never be less than the optimum error of the null model, and that the difference between these minimum error will follow a chi-squared distribution, with degrees of freedom equal those of the proposed model minus those of the null model which, in this case, will be 2-1=1. Using the chi-squared test, we may then estimate how many of these permuted sets of yk will yield an minimum error less than or equal to the minimum  error using the original yk, and so we can estimate how significant an improvement is given by the inclusion of the x variable in the proposed model.

For logistic regression, the measure of goodness-of-fit is the likelihood function L, or its logarithm, the log-likelihood ℓ.

In the case of simple binary logistic regression, the set of K data points are fitted in a probabilistic sense to a function of the form:

where  is the probability that . The log-odds are given by:

and the log-likelihood is:

For the null model, the probability that  is given by:

The log-odds for the null model are given by:

and the log-likelihood is:

  

Since we have  at the maximum of L, the maximum log-likelihood for the null model is 

The optimum  is:

where  is again the mean of the yk values. Again, we can conceptually consider the fit of the proposed model to every permutation of the yk and it can be shown that the maximum log-likelihood of these permutation fits will never be smaller than that of the null model:

Also, as an analog to the error of the linear regression case, we may define the deviance of a logistic regression fit as:

which will always be positive or zero. The reason for this choice is that not only is the deviance a good measure of the goodness of fit, it is also approximately chi-squared distributed, with the approximation improving as the number of data points (K) increases, becoming exactly chi-square distributed in the limit of an infinite number of data points. As in the case of linear regression, we may use this fact to estimate the probability that a random set of data points will give a better fit than the fit obtained by the proposed model, and so have an estimate how significantly the model is improved by including the xk data points in the proposed model. 

For the simple model of student test scores described above, the maximum value of the log-likelihood of the null model is  The maximum value of the log-likelihood for the simple model is  so that the deviance is 

Using the chi-squared test of significance, the integral of the chi-squared distribution with one degree of freedom from 11.6661... to infinity is equal to 0.00063649... 

This effectively means that about 6 out of a 10,000 fits to random yk can be expected to have a better fit (smaller deviance) than the given yk and so we can conclude that the inclusion of the x variable and data in the proposed model is a very significant improvement over the null model. In other words, we reject the null hypothesis with  confidence.

Goodness of fit summary

Goodness of fit in linear regression models is generally measured using R2. Since this has no direct analog in logistic regression, various methods including the following can be used instead.

Deviance and likelihood ratio tests
In linear regression analysis, one is concerned with partitioning variance via the sum of squares calculations – variance in the criterion is essentially divided into variance accounted for by the predictors and residual variance. In logistic regression analysis, deviance is used in lieu of a sum of squares calculations. Deviance is analogous to the sum of squares calculations in linear regression  and is a measure of the lack of fit to the data in a logistic regression model. When a "saturated" model is available (a model with a theoretically perfect fit), deviance is calculated by comparing a given model with the saturated model.  This computation gives the likelihood-ratio test:

In the above equation,  represents the deviance and ln represents the natural logarithm. The log of this likelihood ratio (the ratio of the fitted model to the saturated model) will produce a negative value, hence the need for a negative sign.  can be shown to follow an approximate chi-squared distribution.  Smaller values indicate better fit as the fitted model deviates less from the saturated model. When assessed upon a chi-square distribution, nonsignificant chi-square values indicate very little unexplained variance and thus, good model fit. Conversely, a significant chi-square value indicates that a significant amount of the variance is unexplained.

When the saturated model is not available (a common case), deviance is calculated simply as −2·(log likelihood of the fitted model), and the reference to the saturated model's log likelihood can be removed from all that follows without harm.

Two measures of deviance are particularly important in logistic regression: null deviance and model deviance. The null deviance represents the difference between a model with only the intercept (which means "no predictors") and the saturated model. The model deviance represents the difference between a model with at least one predictor and the saturated model. In this respect, the null model provides a baseline upon which to compare predictor models. Given that deviance is a measure of the difference between a given model and the saturated model, smaller values indicate better fit. Thus, to assess the contribution of a predictor or set of predictors, one can subtract the model deviance from the null deviance and assess the difference on a   chi-square distribution with degrees of freedom equal to the difference in the number of parameters estimated.

Let

Then the difference of both is:

If the model deviance is significantly smaller than the null deviance then one can conclude that the predictor or set of predictors significantly improve the model's fit. This is analogous to the -test used in linear regression analysis to assess the significance of prediction.

Pseudo-R-squared

In linear regression the squared multiple correlation, 2 is used to assess goodness of fit as it represents the proportion of variance in the criterion that is explained by the predictors. In logistic regression analysis, there is no agreed upon analogous measure, but there are several competing measures each with limitations.

Four of the most commonly used indices and one less commonly used one are examined on this page:
 Likelihood ratio 2
 Cox and Snell 2
 Nagelkerke 2
 McFadden 2
 Tjur 2

Hosmer–Lemeshow test
The Hosmer–Lemeshow test uses a test statistic that asymptotically follows a  distribution to assess whether or not the observed event rates match expected event rates in subgroups of the model population.  This test is considered to be obsolete by some statisticians because of its dependence on arbitrary binning of predicted probabilities and relative low power.

Coefficient significance
After fitting the model, it is likely that researchers will want to examine the contribution of individual predictors. To do so, they will want to examine the regression coefficients. In linear regression, the regression coefficients represent the change in the criterion for each unit change in the predictor. In logistic regression, however, the regression coefficients represent the change in the logit for each unit change in the predictor. Given that the logit is not intuitive, researchers are likely to focus on a predictor's effect on the exponential function of the regression coefficient – the odds ratio (see definition). In linear regression, the significance of a regression coefficient is assessed by computing a t test. In logistic regression, there are several different tests designed to assess the significance of an individual predictor, most notably the likelihood ratio test and the Wald statistic.

Likelihood ratio test
The likelihood-ratio test discussed above to assess model fit is also the recommended procedure to assess the contribution of individual "predictors" to a given model. In the case of a single predictor model, one simply compares the deviance of the predictor model with that of the null model on a chi-square distribution with a single degree of freedom. If the predictor model has significantly smaller deviance (c.f. chi-square using the difference in degrees of freedom of the two models), then one can conclude that there is a significant association between the "predictor" and the outcome. Although some common statistical packages (e.g. SPSS) do provide likelihood ratio test statistics, without this computationally intensive test it would be more difficult to assess the contribution of individual predictors in the multiple logistic regression case. To assess the contribution of individual predictors one can enter the predictors hierarchically, comparing each new model with the previous to determine the contribution of each predictor. There is some debate among statisticians about the appropriateness of so-called "stepwise" procedures. The fear is that they may not preserve nominal statistical properties and may become misleading.

Wald statistic
Alternatively, when assessing the contribution of individual predictors in a given model, one may examine the significance of the Wald statistic. The Wald statistic, analogous to the t-test in linear regression, is used to assess the significance of coefficients. The Wald statistic is the ratio of the square of the regression coefficient to the square of the standard error of the coefficient and is asymptotically distributed as a chi-square distribution.

 

Although several statistical packages (e.g., SPSS, SAS) report the Wald statistic to assess the contribution of individual predictors, the Wald statistic has limitations. When the regression coefficient is large, the standard error of the regression coefficient also tends to be larger increasing the probability of Type-II error. The Wald statistic also tends to be biased when data are sparse.

Case-control sampling
Suppose cases are rare. Then we might wish to sample them more frequently than their prevalence in the population. For example, suppose there is a disease that affects 1 person in 10,000 and to collect our data we need to do a complete physical. It may be too expensive to do thousands of physicals of healthy people in order to obtain data for only a few diseased individuals. Thus, we may evaluate more diseased individuals, perhaps all of the rare outcomes. This is also retrospective sampling, or equivalently it is called unbalanced data. As a rule of thumb, sampling controls at a rate of five times the number of cases will produce sufficient control data.

Logistic regression is unique in that it may be estimated on unbalanced data, rather than randomly sampled data, and still yield correct coefficient estimates of the effects of each independent variable on the outcome. We can correct  if we know the true prevalence as follows:

 

Discussion
Like other forms of regression analysis, logistic regression makes use of one or more predictor variables that may be either continuous or categorical. Unlike ordinary linear regression, however, logistic regression is used for predicting dependent variables that take membership in one of a limited number of categories (treating the dependent variable in the binomial case as the outcome of a Bernoulli trial) rather than a continuous outcome. Given this difference, the assumptions of linear regression are violated. In particular, the residuals cannot be normally distributed. In addition, linear regression may make nonsensical predictions for a binary dependent variable. What is needed is a way to convert a binary variable into a continuous one that can take on any real value (negative or positive). To do that, binomial logistic regression first calculates the odds of the event happening for different levels of each independent variable, and then takes its logarithm to create a continuous criterion as a transformed version of the dependent variable.

Although the dependent variable in logistic regression is Bernoulli, the logit is on an unrestricted scale. The logit function is the link function in this kind of generalized linear model, i.e.

The  of the probability of success is then fitted to the predictors. Thus, although the observed dependent variable in binary logistic regression is a 0-or-1 variable, the logistic regression estimates the odds, as a continuous variable, that the dependent variable is a 'success'. In some applications, the odds are all that is needed. In others, a specific yes-or-no prediction is needed for whether the dependent variable is or is not a 'success'; this categorical prediction can be based on the computed odds of success, with predicted odds above some chosen cutoff value being translated into a prediction of success.

Maximum entropy 

Of all the functional forms used for estimating the probabilities of a particular categorical outcome which optimize the fit by maximizing the likelihood function (e.g. probit regression, Poisson regression, etc.), the logistic regression solution is unique in that it is a maximum entropy solution. This is a case of a general property: an exponential family of distributions maximizes entropy, given an expected value. In the case of the logistic model, the logistic function is the natural parameter of the Bernoulli distribution (it is in "canonical form", and the logistic function is the canonical link function), while other sigmoid functions are non-canonical link functions; this underlies its mathematical elegance and ease of optimization. See  for details.

Proof 

In order to show this, we use the method of Lagrange multipliers. The Lagrangian is equal to the entropy plus the sum of the products of Lagrange multipliers times various constraint expressions. The general multinomial case will be considered, since the proof is not made that much simpler by considering simpler cases. Equating the derivative of the Lagrangian with respect to the various probabilities to zero yields a functional form for those probabilities which corresponds to those used in logistic regression.

As in the above section on multinomial logistic regression, we will consider  explanatory variables denoted  and which include . The xmk will also be represented as an -dimensional vector  . There will be  possible values of the categorical variable y ranging from 0 to N.

Let pn(x) be the probability, given explanatory variable vector x, that the outcome will be . Define  which is the probability that for the k-th measurement, the categorical outcome is n.

The Lagrangian will be expressed as a function of the probabilities pnk and will minimized by equating the derivatives of the Lagrangian with respect to these probabilities to zero. An important point is that the probabilities are treated equally and the fact that they sum to unity is part of the Lagrangian formulation, rather than being assumed from the beginning.

The first contribution to the Lagrangian is the entropy:

The log-likelihood is:

Assuming the multinomial logistic function, the derivative of the log-likelihood with respect the beta coefficients was found to be:

A very important point here is that this expression is (remarkably) not an explicit function of the beta coefficients. It is only a function of the probabilities pnk and the data. Rather than being specific to the assumed multinomial logistic case, it is taken to be a general statement of the condition at which the log-likelihood is maximized and makes no reference to the functional form of pnk. There are then (M+1)(N+1) fitting constraints and the fitting constraint term in the Lagrangian is then:

where the λnm are the appropriate Lagrange multipliers. There are K normalization constraints which may be written: 

so that the normalization term in the Lagrangian is:

where the αk are the appropriate Lagrange multipliers. The Lagrangian is then the sum of the above three terms:

Setting the derivative of the Lagrangian with respect to one of the probabilities to zero yields:

Using the more condensed vector notation:

and dropping the primes on the n and k indices, and then solving for  yields:

where:

Imposing the normalization constraint, we can solve for the Zk and write the probabilities as:

The  are not all independent. We can add any constant -dimensional vector to each of the  without changing the value of the  probabilities so that there are only N rather than  independent .

Other approaches

In machine learning applications where logistic regression is used for binary classification, the MLE minimises the Cross entropy loss function.

Logistic regression is an important machine learning algorithm. The goal is to model the probability of a random variable  being 0 or 1 given experimental data.

Therefore,

and since , we see that  is given by  We now calculate the likelihood function assuming that all the observations in the sample are independently Bernoulli distributed,

Typically, the log likelihood is maximized,

which is maximized using optimization techniques such as gradient descent.

Assuming the  pairs are drawn uniformly from the underlying distribution, then in the limit of large N,

This leads to the intuition that by maximizing the log-likelihood of a model, you are minimizing the KL divergence of your model from the maximal entropy distribution. Intuitively searching for the model that makes the fewest assumptions in its parameters.

Comparison with linear regression
Logistic regression can be seen as a special case of the generalized linear model and thus analogous to linear regression. The model of logistic regression, however, is based on quite different assumptions (about the relationship between the dependent and independent variables) from those of linear regression. In particular, the key differences between these two models can be seen in the following two features of logistic regression. First, the conditional distribution  is a Bernoulli distribution rather than a Gaussian distribution, because the dependent variable is binary. Second, the predicted values are probabilities and are therefore restricted to (0,1) through the logistic distribution function because logistic regression predicts the probability of particular outcomes rather than the outcomes themselves.

Alternatives
A common alternative to the logistic model (logit model) is the probit model, as the related names suggest. From the perspective of generalized linear models, these differ in the choice of link function: the logistic model uses the logit function (inverse logistic function), while the probit model uses the probit function (inverse error function). Equivalently, in the latent variable interpretations of these two methods, the first assumes a standard logistic distribution of errors and the second a standard normal distribution of errors. Other sigmoid functions or error distributions can be used instead.

Logistic regression is an alternative to Fisher's 1936 method, linear discriminant analysis.  If the assumptions of linear discriminant analysis hold, the conditioning can be reversed to produce logistic regression.  The converse is not true, however, because logistic regression does not require the multivariate normal assumption of discriminant analysis.

The assumption of linear predictor effects can easily be relaxed using techniques such as spline functions.

History
The logistic function was developed as a model of population growth and named "logistic" by Pierre François Verhulst in the 1830s and 1840s, under the guidance of Adolphe Quetelet; see  for details. In his earliest paper (1838), Verhulst did not specify how he fit the curves to the data. In his more detailed paper (1845), Verhulst determined the three parameters of the model by making the curve pass through three observed points, which yielded poor predictions.

The logistic function was independently developed in chemistry as a model of autocatalysis (Wilhelm Ostwald, 1883). An autocatalytic reaction is one in which one of the products is itself a catalyst for the same reaction, while the supply of one of the reactants is fixed. This naturally gives rise to the logistic equation for the same reason as population growth: the reaction is self-reinforcing but constrained.

They were initially unaware of Verhulst's work and presumably learned about it from L. Gustave du Pasquier, but they gave him little credit and did not adopt his terminology. Verhulst's priority was acknowledged and the term "logistic" revived by Udny Yule in 1925 and has been followed since. Pearl and Reed first applied the model to the population of the United States, and also initially fitted the curve by making it pass through three points; as with Verhulst, this again yielded poor results.

The probit model was principally used in bioassay, and had been preceded by earlier work dating to 1860; see . The probit model influenced the subsequent development of the logit model and these models competed with each other.

The logit model was initially dismissed as inferior to the probit model, but "gradually achieved an equal footing with the logit", particularly between 1960 and 1970. By 1970, the logit model achieved parity with the probit model in use in statistics journals and thereafter surpassed it. This relative popularity was due to the adoption of the logit outside of bioassay, rather than displacing the probit within bioassay, and its informal use in practice; the logit's popularity is credited to the logit model's computational simplicity, mathematical properties, and generality, allowing its use in varied fields.

In 1973 Daniel McFadden linked the multinomial logit to the theory of discrete choice, specifically Luce's choice axiom, showing that the multinomial logit followed from the assumption of independence of irrelevant alternatives and interpreting odds of alternatives as relative preferences; this gave a theoretical foundation for the logistic regression.

Extensions
There are large numbers of extensions:
 Multinomial logistic regression (or multinomial logit) handles the case of a multi-way categorical dependent variable (with unordered values, also called "classification").  Note that the general case of having dependent variables with more than two values is termed polytomous regression.
 Ordered logistic regression (or ordered logit) handles ordinal dependent variables (ordered values).
 Mixed logit is an extension of multinomial logit that allows for correlations among the choices of the dependent variable.
 An extension of the logistic model to sets of interdependent variables is the conditional random field.
 Conditional logistic regression handles matched or stratified data when the strata are small. It is mostly used in the analysis of observational studies.

Software
Most statistical software can do binary logistic regression.

 SPSS
  for basic logistic regression.
 Stata
 SAS
 PROC LOGISTIC for basic logistic regression.
 PROC CATMOD when all the variables are categorical.
 PROC GLIMMIX for multilevel model logistic regression.
 R
 glm in the stats package (using family = binomial)
 lrm in the rms package
 GLMNET package for an efficient implementation regularized logistic regression
 lmer for mixed effects logistic regression
 Rfast package command gm_logistic for fast and heavy calculations involving large scale data.
 arm package for bayesian logistic regression
 Python
 Logit in the Statsmodels module.
 LogisticRegression in the scikit-learn module.
 LogisticRegressor in the TensorFlow module.
 Full example of logistic regression in the Theano tutorial 
 Bayesian Logistic Regression with ARD prior code, tutorial
 Variational Bayes Logistic Regression with ARD prior code , tutorial
 Bayesian Logistic Regression  code, tutorial
 NCSS
 Logistic Regression in NCSS
 Matlab	
 mnrfit in the Statistics and Machine Learning Toolbox (with "incorrect" coded as 2 instead of 0)
 fminunc/fmincon, fitglm, mnrfit, fitclinear, mle can all do logistic regression.
Java (JVM)
LibLinear
Apache Flink
Apache Spark
SparkML supports Logistic Regression
FPGA
 Logistic Regresesion IP core in HLS for FPGA.

Notably, Microsoft Excel's statistics extension package does not include it.

See also

 Logistic function
 Discrete choice
 Jarrow–Turnbull model
 Limited dependent variable
 Multinomial logit model
 Ordered logit
 Hosmer–Lemeshow test
 Brier score
 mlpack - contains a C++ implementation of logistic regression
 Local case-control sampling
 Logistic model tree

References

Further reading

 
 
 
 Published in:

External links

 by Mark Thoma
Logistic Regression tutorial
mlelr: software in C for teaching purposes

 
Predictive analytics
Regression models